Lamberton Lake is a  freshwater lake located in Kent County in Western Michigan. A low ridge runs along the east side of the lake and overlooks it.

Hydrology
Lamberton Lake is fed by Lamberton Creek, which flows from Emerald Lake to Lamberton Lake, entering the lake at the northeast. Two springs also feed the lake. Lamberton Lake discharges into Lamberton Creek at the southeast. Lamberton Creek flows south, then turns west and eventually flows into the Grand River.

Natural environment
Most of the lake bottom is composed of marl; the deeper parts are mostly composed of pulpy peat.

Located both to the northwest and southeast of the lake in two parcels sits the 24 acre Lamberton Lake Fen Nature Preserve, managed by the Land Conservancy of West Michigan. Established in 1994, it was expanded ten years later. Lamberton Creek flows from the lake through the preserve's southeast parcel, where the fen is located. The fen is home to many native plant and animal species.

The wetlands around the lake were more extensive in the past. However, already by 1901 much of this area had been reclaimed. This was due to a lower lake level caused by the deepening of the creek.

History
In the late nineteenth century Lamberton Lake with Lamberton Creek was under consideration as one of several possible sources for the water supply of the growing city of Grand Rapids.

See also
List of lakes in Michigan

References

Further reading

Geography of Grand Rapids, Michigan
Lakes of Kent County, Michigan
Lakes of Michigan